7400 or variant, may refer to:

In general
 A.D. 7400, a year in the 8th millennium CE
 7400 BCE, a year in the 8th millennium BC
 7400, a number in the 7000 (number) range

Electronics and computing
 Texas Instruments 7400-series integrated circuits
 PowerPC 7400 CPU chip
 MITS 7400 Scientific and Engineering Calculator

Other uses
 7400 Lenau, an asteroid in the Asteroid Belt, the 7400th asteroid registered
 7400 (District of Kolonjë), one of the postal codes in Albania
 GWR 7400 Class locomotives

See also

 List of 7400-series integrated circuits